Zinho Gano (born 13 October 1993) is a professional footballer who plays as a forward for SV Zulte Waregem. Born in Belgium, he plays for the Guinea-Bissau national team.

Early life 
Gano was born in Sint-Katelijne-Waver, Belgium to a Bissau-Guinean father and a Belgian Flemish mother.

Club career 
Gano is a youth exponent from Brugge. During the 2013–14 season, he scored six goals out of 22 league games with Belgian Second Division side Lommel United, on loan from Brugge. Then he played on loan for Mouscron in the Belgian Pro League. He made his top division debut at 27 July 2014 against Anderlecht. On 2 July 2018 he joined Genk from fellow Pro League side Oostende for a value of £1.62 million.

On 2 September 2019, he joined Antwerp on a season-long loan with an option to buy.

International career
Gano made his senior debut for Guinea-Bissau on 23 March 2022, starting in a 3–0 friendly win over Equatorial Guinea.

Honours
Genk
Belgian First Division A: 2018–19

References

External links

1993 births
Living people
People from Sint-Katelijne-Waver
Footballers from Antwerp Province
Bissau-Guinean footballers
Guinea-Bissau international footballers
Belgian footballers
Bissau-Guinean people of Belgian descent
Belgian people of Bissau-Guinean descent
Citizens of Guinea-Bissau through descent
Association football forwards
People of Flemish descent
Club Brugge KV players
Lommel S.K. players
Royal Excel Mouscron players
S.K. Beveren players
K.V. Oostende players
K.R.C. Genk players
Royal Antwerp F.C. players
S.V. Zulte Waregem players
Belgian Pro League players
Belgian sportspeople of African descent